Fentimans is a botanical brewery based in Hexham, Northumberland, England.

History
Thomas Fentiman, an iron puddler from Cleckheaton, West Yorkshire, acquired a recipe for botanically brewed ginger beer in 1905 when a fellow tradesman approached Fentiman for a loan. The loan was never repaid so Thomas became the owner of the recipe. The firm became a door-to-door ginger beer sales company using a horse-drawn vehicle for transport. His ginger beer was stored in handmade stone jars known as 'grey hens', all stamped with the Fentimans mascot based on Thomas' German Shepherd dog 'Fearless' who won the Crufts obedience class twice in 1933 and 1934. The botanically brewed ginger beer became popular quickly and the business grew, with several brewing and production facilities being opened in the North of England.

The company fell on hard times as supermarkets entered the soft drinks market. As a result, sales of the Grey Hens (the stone jars in which ginger beer was sold) slumped and the company closed down in the mid 1960s. But in 1988, Thomas Fentiman's great grandson re-established the business with a mission to produce drinks in the original way, using the traditional ginger beer recipe and 100% natural ingredients. From then, with old-style products and vintage goods becoming more popular, Fentimans has enjoyed a wave of popularity.

Since 1905, Fentimans has been brewing botanical sodas with ingredients including roots, bark and flowers, and with the exception of adding new flavours, Fentimans are still making their sodas the same as they did back at the turn of the century. Some production processes have been updated, for example, pasteurisation has been introduced to extend the shelf life of the drinks. This, in turn, causes the loss of some carbon dioxide, so addition of mild carbonation was introduced.

21st century
Fentimans expected to double its turnover from 2015 to 2019, driven by demand from mainland Europe and the US. Fentimans has franchised in the US, where products are manufactured in Pennsylvania and are available across North America. More than two-thirds of Fentimans' overseas sales are in Europe, with the bulk of the remainder in the US, Japan, South America, Canada and Russia. Both UK and US divisions use the same recipe and brewing methods to create Fentimans. North America has purchased identical brewery equipment to that used decades ago, to maintain the characteristic flavour.

Fentimans' range includes both gluten-free alcoholic ginger beer and a mixer range; mixers include tonic, diet tonic, rose lemonade, bitter lemonade and ginger ale.

Botanical brewing
Thomas Fentiman's botanical brewing is a technique using a combination of infusion, blending and fermentation of natural ingredients. This approach has not changed much in over 100 years as the knowledge and expertise have been passed on from generation to generation of the Fentiman family.

Thomas Fentiman's original recipe involved milling ginger roots before putting them into copper steam-jacketed pans and leaving them to simmer to release their flavour. Natural botanical ingredients such as herbs, natural flavourings, sugar, spring water and brewer's yeast were then added, thoroughly stirred, and boiled together. The liquid was then transferred into wooden vats and left to undergo the process of fermentation. The liquid went on fermenting and was then decanted from the wooden vats into the iconic handmade stone jars ('grey hens') where it would be ready to drink within seven days.

Alcohol content
In 2009 the state of Maine in the United States banned the sale of Fentimans Victorian Lemonade to anyone aged under 21 after reclassifying it as an "Imitation Liquor". The ban was introduced after a schoolboy in the small town of Houlton, Maine, noticed the lemonade's label stated it contained "up to 0.5% alcohol" and showed his high school principal. They in turn contacted the local police who went to the State's liquor licensing officials and Maine's attorney general's office. Fentimans responded to the ban with a statement telling any concerned citizens of Houlton and law enforcement officers and officials to steer clear of the company's other naturally-fermented botanical soft drinks. Although the lemonade label states that the beverage may contain up to 0.5% alcohol by volume (below the soft drinks' alcohol limit legislated for in the United States of America), Fentimans said it was closer to 0.3%, the same as many common products such as mouthwashes or chewing gums. A person would need to consume 200 fluid ounces (5.7 litres or 12 US pints) to equal the intoxication level from one beer.

Products

Fentimans' current products are:

Soft drinks (275ml/750ml)

 Curiosity Cola
 Cherry Cola
 Dandelion & Burdock
 Mandarin and Seville Orange Jigger
 Lemon Shandy
 Victorian Lemonade
 Rose Lemonade
 Traditional Ginger Beer 
 Sparkling Lime and Jasmine
 Gently Sparkling Elderflower
 Old English Root Beer
 Apple and Blackberry
 Sparkling Raspberry
 Pink Ginger

Mixers (125 ml/500 ml)
 Ginger Ale
 Tonic Water/Light Tonic Water
 Rose Lemonade
 Curiosity Cola
 Pink Grapefruit Tonic Water
 Valencian Orange Tonic Water
 Connoisseurs Tonic Water
 Pink Rhubarb Tonic Water
 Oriental Yuzu Tonic
 Tropical Soda
 Elderflower & Rose Tonic

Craft beer
 Hollows & Fentimans Alcoholic Ginger Beer

References

External links
 Fentimans
 Fentimans North America

1905 establishments in the United Kingdom
Companies based in Northumberland
English brands
Food and drink companies established in 1905
Ginger beer
Hexham